This is a list of Chileans who are famous or notable.

Economists

 Ricardo J. Caballero – MIT professor, Department of Economics
 Sebastián Edwards – UCLA professor, former World Bank officer (1993–1996), prolific author and media personality
 Alejandro Foxley – Chile's first Finance Minister after the return of democracy in 1990 and an engineer of the country's economic miracle during democracy; former Foreign Affairs minister, and former Chilean Senator for East kakarackoj
 Manfred Max Neef – Right Livelihood Award winner, presidential candidate, member of the Club of Rome, former president of the Universidad Austral
 José Piñera – implemented the privatization of the Chilean pension system under Pinochet
 Andrés Velasco – Sumitomo Professor of International Finance and Development in the John F. Kennedy School of Government, Harvard University; Finance Minister during Bachelet's administration

Military

 Manuel Baquedano – general of the Chilean forces during the War of the Pacific
 Philip Bazaar – recipient of the US Navy Medal of Honour
 José Miguel Carrera – first Commander-in-Chief of the Chilean Army and Independence leader of the Patria Vieja
 Luis Carrera – Chilean military officer in the War of Independence
 Ignacio Carrera Pinto – captain in charge of the Chilean patrol who died in Battle of La Concepción
 Carlos Condell – captain of the Covadonga ship at the Iquique Naval Combat
 Manuel Contreras – head of Augusto Pinochet's National Intelligence Directorate (DINA)
 Manuel Hipólito Orella – sailor who was one of the first midshipman of the Chilean Navy
 Patricio Lynch – governor of Lima during the Chilean occupation of Lima, Perú, during the War of the Pacific
 Juan MacKenna – Irish-born organizer of O'Higgins's Army
 Bernardo O'Higgins – founder of modern Chile
 Arturo Prat – captain of the Esmeralda ship at the Iquique Naval Combat; regarded as a national hero
 Luis Pardo – also known as Piloto Pardo, Chilean Navy captain who rescued the survivors of the Shackleton expedition
 Sofanor Parra – officer of the cavalry branch of the Chilean Army who fought in almost all the military actions of the War of the Pacific
 Juan de Quiroga y Apablaza – military figure
 Manuel Rodríguez – Independence leader and guerrilla leader during the Reconquista
 Eleuterio Ramírez – officer, hero of the War of the Pacific
 José Ignacio Zenteno – lieutenant Colonel of the Army of the Andes, Minister of War and Marine in the O'Higgins government

Musicians

 Los Abandoned – alternative rock band
 Américo – cumbia chilena singer
 Tom Araya – singer/bassist for thrash metal band Slayer
 Claudio Arrau – classical piano player
 Germán Casas – 1960s singer
 Beto Cuevas – lead singer from rock group La Ley
 Luis 'Lucho' Gatica – bolero singer
 Eduardo Gatti – a leading composer of modern Chilean music
 Jorge González – controversial lead singer and songwriter of historic Chilean rock band Los Prisioneros
 Rodrigo González – bassist and singer of the German band die Ärzte
 Alberto Guerrero – Chilean–Canadian composer, pianist, and teacher
 Myriam Hernández – popular music singer
 Alicia Ika – native Rapa Nui actress, musician, songwriter, surf instructor and tourist agent. Star in 180 Degrees South: Conquerors of the Useless (2010).
 Pascuala Ilabaca – singer-songwriter
 Inti-Illimani – pioneers of the nueva canción chilena movement; known communists and "pro-democracy" activists in exile during Pinochet dictatorship
 Víctor Jara – Chilean folk singer and theatrical director; political activist; communist
 Alain Johannes – Chilean born musician, songwriter, sound engineer; best known as founding member of Alternative Rock American band Eleven
 Rafael Manríquez – nueva canción musician
 Camila Gallardo
 Paloma Mami
 DJ Méndez – urban music producer
 La Noche – cumbia chilena band
 Chañaral Ortega-Miranda – contemporary composer
 Ángel Parra – folk musician (nueva canción); son of Violeta Parra
 Isabel Parra – folk musician; daughter of Violeta Parra
 Javiera Parra – lead singer from group Javiera y los Imposibles Violeta Parra – Chilean folk singer
 Antonio Prieto – singer and actor known in English for "The Bride" or "The Wedding" song
 Quilapayún – nueva canción ensemble, supporters of Popular Unity (UP) coalition during presidency of Salvador Allende
 Leo Rey – cumbia chilena singer
 Alejandro Silva – heavy metal guitar player
 Saiko – pop rock band
 Clara Solovera (1909–1992) – songwriter, born in Santiago
 Esther Soré (1915–1996) – 1940s singer, born in Santiago
 Fernando Ubiergo – folk singer-songwriter (Chilean folk), born in Valparaíso
 Francisca Valenzuela – singer-songwriter
 Ricardo Villalobos – minimal techno artist
 Verónica Villarroel – soprano
 Ramón Vinay – tenor
 Javiera Mena – Indie electropop musician
 Mon Laferte – singer-songwriter
 Luis "Checho" González – folklore composer, born in Iquique
  Oscar Lopez – senior latin guitarists musician, born in Santiago
 El Monteaguilino – Cueca composer, born in Monte Águila

Artists

 Claudio Bravo (1936–2011) – hyper-realist painter
 Carlos Catasse – painter
 Marta Colvin – sculptor
 Alfredo Jaar – installation artist, filmmaker and architect
 Olga Lehmann – painter
 Roberto Matta – painter, sculptor
 Camilo Mori – painter
 Dora Puelma – artist
 Carlos Sotomayor – cubist painter
 Miguel Venegas – painter, called "El Maestro" (the Master)

Politicians

 Juana Rosa Aguirre – former first lady, wife of Pedro Aguirre Cerda
 Arturo Alessandri – served twice as president of Chile
 Jorge Alessandri – 27th President of Chile; President of Council of State under Pinochet Regime
 Salvador Allende – former senator and president of Chile; ousted in a military coup
 Clodomiro Almeyda – socialist politician
 Soledad Alvear – former Justice minister and Foreign minister; current PDC senator
 Celinda Arregui – feminist politician, writer, teacher, suffrage activist 
 Gabriel Boric – first youth leader politician of Chile
 Michelle Bachelet – first woman president of Chile
 Achta Saleh Damane (fl. 2010s), journalist and politician
 Carlos Dávila – former Secretary General of the Organization of American States
 Florencio Durán – former president of the senate
 Héctor Faúndez – diplomat
 Fernando Flores – businessman and former senator
 Gabriel González Videla – 25th President of Chile (1946-1952)
 Jaime Guzmán – right wing politician during the Pinochet regime; murdered by Manuel Rodríguez Patriotic Front on April 1, 1991; former UDI Senator
 Tomás Hirsch – former president of the Humanist Party of Chile; 2005 candidate for president
 José Miguel Insulza – former Interior minister; current Secretary General of the Organization of American States
 José Antonio Kast — president of the Republican Party, former deputy and councilman, presidential candidate in 2017 and in 2021.
 Carlos Keller – former Leader of the National Socialist Movement of Chile, responsible for the organization of the Seguro Obrero Massacre
 Joaquín Lavín – Independent Democratic Union candidate for presidency in 2005 election; former mayor of Las Condes and Santiago
 Orlando Letelier – Foreign Minister during Salvador Allende's government murdered during the Pinochet regime in Washington, D.C.
 Gladys Marín – communist leader, feminist activist, lived in exile, opposed conservatism and liberal economy, admirer of Lenin and Marx
 Raúl Morales Beltramí – politician and physician
 Sebastián Piñera – Chilean billionaire, businessman and politician; former President of Chile
 Aníbal Pinto – 9th President of Chile (1876-1881)
 Augusto Pinochet – Commander-in-Chief of the Armed Forces of Chile, President of the Government Junta of Chile, dictator from 1973 until 1990 and President from 1981 onwards.
 Diego Portales – Minister, major designer of the Chilean State during the first half of the 19th century
 Juan Antonio Ríos (1888–1946) – Chilean lawyer, political figure and 24th President of Chile
 Laura Rodríguez – first Humanist Party deputy in the world
 Camila Vallejo – Member of Parliament, led 2011 student protests in Chile
 Chris Watson – third Prime Minister of Australia
 Adolfo Zaldívar – PRI senator, former leader of the PDC
 Andrés Zaldívar – former PDC senator

Religious figures

 Rodolfo Acevedo – Mormon bishop
 Saint Teresa de los Andes – first Chilean saint
 Carlos Camus – Chilean bishop
 Francisco Javier Errázuriz – fourth Chilean cardinal
 Juan Francisco Fresno – third Chilean cardinal
 Raúl Silva Henríquez – second Chilean cardinal born in Talca; human rights advocate
 Alberto Hurtado – saint
 Jorge Medina – fifth Chilean cardinal; conservative figure
 Fr. Juan Ignacio Molina – Chilean priest, naturalist, historian, botanist, ornithologist, geographer
 José María Caro Rodríguez – first Chilean cardinal
 Francisco Javier Quintanilla – theologian 
 Juan Subercaseaux Errázuriz – Chilean Roman Catholic Archbishop
 José María Vélaz – Chilean priest
 Blessed Laura Vicuña

Sports

 Omar Aguilar – long-distance runner
 Marlene Ahrens – javelin thrower; Olympic silver medalist
 Fernando Alvarez – jockey
 Francisco Andra – former football player
 David Arellano – football player; namesake of Colo-Colo's stadium
 Luis Ayala – tennis player; twice French Open finalist
 Gonzalo Barrios – eSports player
 Claudio Bravo – football player, FC Barcelona
 Ben Brereton  – football player
 Nick Carle – football player, Sydney FC
 Patricio Castañeda – football player
 Carlos Caszely – football player
 Patricio Cornejo – tennis player, 1976 Davis Cup finalist
 Cristian Garín – tennis player, winner of 4 ATP titles
 Carlo de Gavardo – KTM rally motorcyclist
 Elías Figueroa – football player; three times elected as Best Football Player of America
 Jaime Fillol – tennis player, 1976 Davis Cup finalist
 Arturo Godoy – boxer, fought Joe Louis twice for the World Heavyweight title
 Fernando González – tennis player; only Chilean to win gold, silver and bronze medals at the Summer Olympics
 Tomás González – gymnast, Olympic finalist
 Juan Halty – former professional footballer
 Kai Horwitz (born 1998) – Olympic alpine skier
 Luis Jiménez (born 1987) – footballer
 Benjamín Kuscevic – football player
 Alberto Larraguibel – horse rider, record for puissance (high jump) on horseback
 Sergio Sapo Livingstone – Chilean football goalkeeper
 Anita Lizana – tennis player; 1937 US Open champion; first Latin American, and first Hispanic person, to be ranked World Number 1 in tennis
 Nicolás Massú (born 1979) – tennis player; highest world ranking #9, Olympic 2-time champion (singles and doubles)
 Carlos Moreno – track and field sprinter
 Iván Morovic – chess International Grandmaster
 Isidora Niemeyer – rower
 Érika Olivera – marathon runner; gold medal winner in women's marathon at the 1999 Pan American Games
 Andrés Parada - footballer
 Manuel Pellegrini – former footballer for Universidad de Chile, former manager of Real Madrid
 Alejandra Ramos – middle-distance runner
 Monica Regonesi – long-distance runner
 Sammis Reyes – basketball and American football player; first Chilean to play in the NFL
 Fernando Riera – Chile's most successful soccer coach; led the national team to a third-place finish in the 1962 World Cup
 Marcelo Ríos – first Latin American man to become world number-one tennis player
 Eduardo Robledo – football player, Newcastle United F.C.
 Jorge Robledo – player, Newcastle United F.C.
 Jose Romero – AFL player, Western Bulldogs
 Sebastián Rozental (born 1976) - professional soccer player
 Marcelo Salas – football player; holds the record for most goals playing for the national team; won titles with every team he played with
 Eliseo Salazar – race car driver, competed in Formula One intermittently from 1980–1982, moved to Champ Car and the Indy Racing League
 Alexis Sánchez – football player, Inter Milan
 Leonel Sánchez – football player, 1962 World Cup top scorer
 José A. Santos – jockey, winner of US Triple Crown
 Alejandro Silva – long-distance runner
 Pablo Squella – middle-distance runner
 José Sulantay – Chile's second most successful soccer coach, led the under 20 national team to a third-place finish at the 2007 FIFA U-20 World Cup in Canada
 Emilio Ulloa – long-distance runner
 Dion Valle – football player, Marconi Stallions FC
 Rodrigo Vargas – football player, Melbourne Victory FC
 Arturo Vidal – football player, FC Barcelona
 Gert Weil – shot putter
 Iván Zamorano – football player

Scientists and engineers

 Ricardo Baeza Rodríguez – mathematician
 Ricardo Baeza-Yates – computer scientist
 Erik Bongcam-Rudloff – bioinformatician
 Claudio Bunster – physicist
 Marcela Contreras – immunologist
 F. J. Duarte – laser physicist
 Matias Duarte – software inventor
 Julio M. Fernandez – biologist, academic
 Eric Goles – mathematician
 Mario Hamuy – cosmologist and astronomer
 Cesar A. Hidalgo – physicist
 Cecilia Hidalgo Tapia – biochemist
 Adriana Hoffmann – botanist, Environment Minister (2000–2001)
 Paula Jofré – astronomer and astrophysicist
 Humberto Maturana – biologist, co-author of the theory of autopoiesis
 Juan Ignacio Molina – 18th and 19th-century natural scientist
 Ernestina Pérez Barahona, physician
 María Teresa Ruiz – astronomer
 Pablo DT Valenzuela – biotechnologist, co-founder of Chiron Corporation and Fundacion Ciencias Para la Vida
 Francisco Varela – biologist, co-author of the theory of autopoiesis

Film and television personalities

 
 Alejandro Amenábar - film director, screenwriter and composer
 Cecilia Amenábar - actress, TV presenter and model
 Cecilia Bolocco - TV presenter, journalist and former Miss Universe
 Diana Bolocco - TV presenter and journalist
 Santiago Cabrera - actor
 Felipe Camiroaga - TV presenter
 Charissa Chamorro - actress 
 Martín Cárcamo - TV presenter
 Karen Doggenweiler - TV presenter
 Julián Elfenbein - radio and TV presenter
 Pablo Francisco - comedian, actor and writer
 Cristián de la Fuente - actor and model
 Alberto Fuguet - film director, author, journalist and film critic
 Jorge Garcia - actor and comedian
 Paulina García - actress
 Luis Gatica - actor
 Claudia di Girolamo - actress
 Luis Gnecco - actor
 Lisa Guerrero - journalist, TV presenter, actress and model
 Patricio Guzmán - film director
 Alejandro Jodorowsky - filmmaker
 Mario Kreutzberger (Don Francisco) – TV presenter
 Pablo Larraín - film director
 Sebastián Lelio - film director and screenwriter
 Ariel Levy - actor
 Carolina Mestrovic - TV presenter and actress
 Claudio Miranda - cinematographer
 Cristina Montt - actress
 Cote de Pablo - actress
 Pedro Pascal - actor
 Carlos Pinto - TV presenter and journalist
 Nicole Polizzi – reality TV Personality
 Antonio Prieto - actor and singer 
 Francisco Puelles - actor and TV personality
 Francisco Reyes Morandé - actor
 Raúl Ruiz - film director 
 Katherine Salosny - TV presenter and actress
 Horatio Sanz - actor and comedian
 Fernando Solis - radio and TV presenter
 Tonka Tomicic - TV presenter and model
 Catalina Vallejos - actress and model
 Leonor Varela - actress and model
 Daniela Vega - actress
 Benjamín Vicuña - actor
 Alexander Witt - filmmaker
 Andrés Wood - film director and screenwriter

Writers

 Fernando Alegría – writer
 Isabel Allende – novelist (The House of Spirits)
 Roberto Ampuero – novelist (Cayetano Brulé series)
 Roberto Bolaño – novelist (The Savage Detectives, 2666)
 Liborio Brieba – writer
 Francisco Coloane – (Tierra del fuego)
 Angel Cruchaga Santa Maria (1893–1964) – writer, won the Chilean National Prize for Literature in 1948
 Eugenio Cruz Vargas (1923–2014) – poet and painter, of Basque descent
 Francisco Núñez de Pineda y Bascuñán – writer of Cautiverio feliz y razón individual de las guerras dilatadas del Reino de Chile in 1673
 Pablo de Rokha – Chilean National Prize for Literature in 1965
 José Donoso – writer (Coronation, The Obscene Bird of Night)
 Ariel Dorfman – novelist, playwright (Death and the Maiden), academic, essayist, journalist and human rights activist
 Jorge Edwards – 1999 Cervantes Prize winner
 Alberto Fuguet – novelist; short story writer, Mala Onda, Las películas de mi vida; filmmaker, Se Arrienda Alberto Blest Gana – novelist (Martín Rivas)
 Olga Grau - philosopher
Juan Guzman Cruchaga  (1895–1979) – poet and diplomat, won the Chilean National Prize for Literature in 1962; of Basque descent
 Óscar Hahn – writer and poet
 Vicente Huidobro – father of the "Creationism" movement in Paris
 Cristián Huneeus – writer
 Enrique Lafourcade – novelist
 Hernán Rivera Letelier – novelist (Santa María de las Flores Negras, La Reina Isabel Cantaba Rancheras), poet, writer of short stories
 Enrique Lihn – poet, playwright, and novelist
 Carmen Marai – novelist El Alba de la Mandrágora (The Dawn of the Mandrake), poet, writer of short stories
 Sergio Missana – novelist 
 Gabriela Mistral – winner of the Nobel prize for literature
 Tomás Moulian – political scientist and sociologist
 Pablo Neruda – winner of the Nobel prize for literature
 Nicanor Parra – self-proclaimed "anti-poet"
 Adolfo Quiros – (1853–1910), poet 
 Gonzalo Rojas – 2004 Cervantes Prize winner
 Elvira Santa Cruz Ossa – dramatist and novelist
 Luis Sepúlveda – novelist
 Antonio Skármeta – author of Ardiente Paciencia (Burning Patience), which inspired the movie Il Postino (The Postman), about poet Pablo Neruda
 Mercedes Valdivieso – writer
 Sergio Vodanovic – playwright

Architects

 Alejandro Aravena – 2015 Pritzker Prize winner
 Guillermo Jullian de la Fuente
 Mathias Klotz – 2001 Borromini Prize of Architecture winner for under-40 architects

Others

 Raúl Aldunate Phillips –  writer, politician, and soldier
 Vanessa Ceruti – Miss Universe Chile 2011
 Nataly Chilet – Miss World Chile 2008
 Claudio Grossman – chairman of the Human Rights Interamerican Court
 Hil Hernández – Miss Earth 2006
 Carlos Kaiser – former National Director of the National Fund for Disabilities
 Themo Lobos – comic artist
 Andrónico Luksic – chairman of Quiñenco Holdings, which owns Banco de Chile, Antofagasta Minerals, one of the largest Chilean financial groups
 La Quintrala – Catalina de los Ríos y Lisperguer, aristocratic and sadistic landowner and witch during the Colonial Period
 Rene Ríos Boettiger (Pepo) – comic artist (Condorito'')
 Juana Ross Edwards (1830–1913) – philanthropist
 Sola Sierra – human rights activist
 Juan Somavia – Director-General of the International Labour Organization
 Joaquín Toesca – designer of the presidential house "La Moneda", in Santiago
 Maria Jose Ubiergo – Chilean DREAMer in the United States, Story Featured in the New York Times; Family member to notable Chilean Folk Singer Fernando Ubiergo  Her story has been featured in El Diario, ABC, and News 12 Connecticut, among other media outlets. 
 Arturo Valenzuela – former Assistant Secretary of State for Western Hemisphere Affairs
 Bernardita Zúñiga – Miss World Chile 2007

See also
 Chilean American
 Chilean Australian
 Chilean British
 List of people by nationality

References